Sar is a comarca in the province of A Coruña, Galicia, western Spain. The overall population of this  local region is 17,354  (2005).

Municipalities
Dodro
Padrón
Rois

O Sar